Interstate 405  may refer to:

 Interstate 405 (California), a bypass of Los Angeles, California
 Interstate 405 (Oregon), a bypass of Portland, Oregon
 Interstate 405 (Washington), a bypass of Seattle, Washington

See also
 Highway 405
 Ontario Highway 405

05-4
4